Andres Serrano (born August 15, 1950) is an American photographer and artist. His work, often considered transgressive art, includes photos of corpses and uses feces and bodily fluids. His Piss Christ (1987) is a red-tinged photograph of a crucifix submerged in a glass container of what was purported to be the artist's own urine. He also created the artwork for the heavy metal band Metallica's Load and Reload albums.

Early life
Serrano was born in New York City on August 15, 1950. He is from a half Honduran, half Afro-Cuban background, and was raised a strict Roman Catholic. He studied from 1967 to 1969 at the Brooklyn Museum Art School, yet is considered to be a self-taught photographer. In December 1980, he married artist Julie Ault. In a 2012 interview, Serrano references Ault as his "first wife" and Irina Movmyga as his current wife. Serrano has said that he is a Christian.

Career

He worked as an assistant art director at an advertising firm, before creating his first works in 1983. Photographer Alex Harsley put Serrano's work in his first New York City show at his Fourth Street Photo Gallery.

His work has been exhibited in diverse locations around the world including the Episcopal Cathedral of St. John the Divine in New York City, World without end (2001), and a retrospective at the Barbican Arts Centre in London, Body and soul (2001).

His exhibitions have often inspired angry reactions. On October 5, 2007, his group of photographs called The History of Sex were on display and several were vandalized at an art gallery in Lund, Sweden by people who were believed to be part of a neo-Nazi group. On April 16, 2011, after two weeks of protests and a campaign of hate mail and abusive phone calls to an art gallery displaying his work, orchestrated by groups of French Catholic fundamentalists, approximately a thousand people marched through the streets of Avignon, to protest outside the gallery. On April 17, 2011, two of his works, Piss Christ and The Church, were vandalized. The gallery director plans to reopen the museum with the damaged works on show "so people can see what barbarians can do".

He has shot an array of subject matter including portraits of Klansmen, morgue photos, and pictures of burn victims. He went into the New York City Subway with lights and photographic background paper to portray the bedraggled homeless, as well as producing some rather tender but sometimes decidedly kinky portraits of couples. One of these last shows what Adrian Searle of The Guardian described as "a young couple, she with a strap-on dildo, he with a mildly expectant expression."

Many of Serrano's pictures involve bodily fluids in some way—depicting, for example, blood (sometimes menstrual blood), semen (for example, Blood and Semen II (1990)) or human breast milk. Within this series are a number of works in which objects are submerged in bodily fluids. Among these is Piss Christ (1987), a photograph of a plastic crucifix submerged in a glass of the artist's own urine, which caused great controversy when first exhibited. The work was sold for $277,000 in 1999, which was far beyond the estimated $20,000 – $30,000. Serrano, alongside other artists such as Robert Mapplethorpe, Barbara Degenevieve, and Merry Alpern, became a figure whom Senator Jesse Helms, and Senator Alphonse D'Amato, as well as other cultural conservatives, attacked for producing offensive art while others, including The New York Times, defended him in the name of artistic freedom. (See the American "culture wars" of the 1990s).

Serrano's series Objects of Desire, from the early 1990s, features close-ups of firearms, photographed at the Slidell, Louisiana home of artist Blake Nelson Boyd. Included is a shot, against a glowing orange background, down the barrel of a loaded .45 revolver (belonging to Boyd's grandfather) that was used by Jonas Mekas for the cover of the April–May–June 2007 Anthology Film Archives catalog.

Critical reception of Serrano's work has been mixed. In a 1989 New York Times review, critic Michael Brenson responded to Serrano's series of Cibachrome photographs of iconic objects submerged in bodily fluids: "You cannot consider the content of Mr. Serrano's work without considering his attitude toward photography. It is the photograph that breaks through convention, that makes the search possible and that enables the artist to sort out what he likes and does not like in religion and art. It is the photograph that becomes the vessel of transformation and revelation. The photograph then becomes an icon that, for Mr. Serrano, replaces the false icons in his work. The photograph is clean and purified, the reliquary or shrine in which he clearly believes that the word about the body can be stored and spread." Reviewing later work in 2001, Guardian art critic Adrian Searle was not impressed: he found that Serrano's photos were "far more about being lurid than anything else... In the end, the show is all surface, and looking for hidden depths does no good." Continuing his use of biological matter, more recent work of Serrano's uses feces as a medium.

Serrano's work Blood and Semen III is used as the cover of heavy metal band Metallica's album Load, while "Piss and Blood" is used on Reload. Serrano also directed a video for industrial metal group Godflesh, "Crush My Soul".

In 2008, Serrano's piece The Interpretation of Dreams (White Nigger) was selected to participate in The Renaissance Society's group exhibit, "Black Is, Black Ain't".

Serrano adopted the alter ego "Brutus Faust" to create the full-length album Vengeance Is Mine in July 2010. The album contains covers of classic songs from the 1960s, and original compositions including four songs written by Serrano's wife Irina Movmyga as well as one song co-written by Serrano, Thad DeBrock, and album producer Steve Messina of New York City–based band Blow Up Hollywood. Coinciding with the release of the album are the videos Goo Goo Gaga, Love Letters, and Bad Moon Rising. Goo Goo Gaga consists mostly of black-and-white footage from the 1940s, which makes parallels between the Depression and the present day, with the images of "Brutus" shot by Francesco Carrozzini. Love Letters is footage taken from cult director Joe Sarno's Flesh and Lace. Bad Moon Rising consists entirely of footage Serrano compiled from several short films by John Santerineross. All of these short films were edited by Vincent V.

In 2013, Serrano made a work of art called Sign of the Times by collecting 200 signs from homeless people in New York City, usually paying $20 for each sign. He described the work as "a testimony to the homeless men and women who roam the streets in search of food and shelter. It's also a chronicle of the times we live in." Over the course of several months, Serrano engaged with over 85 homeless individuals in Manhattan and photographed them for a series called Residents of New York, a site-specific public art exhibition on display from May 19 to June 15, 2014, at the West Fourth Street – Washington Square subway station, on LaGuardia Place (between West 3rd and Bleecker Streets), at Judson Memorial Church, and in phone booths and posters around the city. The installation was produced and developed by More Art, a nonprofit organization based in New York that is dedicated to the development of socially engaged public art projects. Serrano initially photographed homeless individuals in the city in 1990 for a series of studio-style portraits titled Nomads. In Residents of New York, he removed his signature studio elements, focusing instead on personal connectivity and interaction directly on the streets of New York City, where the homeless live.

See also
Banksy
Blood Cross
Cinema of Transgression
New French Extremity
Nick Zedd
Piss Christ
Shock art
Transgressive art

References

External links

1950 births
African-American Christians
African-American photographers
American photographers
People with albinism
Artists from New York City
Hispanic and Latino American artists
Living people
American people of Honduran descent
American people of Cuban descent
Censorship in the arts
Obscenity controversies in photography
Obscenity controversies in art
People of Afro–Cuban descent
Album-cover and concert-poster artists
Brooklyn Museum Art School alumni
20th-century African-American people